Connecticut's 82nd House of Representatives district elects one member of the Connecticut House of Representatives. It consists of the town of Middlefield and parts of Meriden. It has been represented by Democrat Michael Quinn since 2021.

Recent elections

2020

2018

2016

2014

2012

References

82